Ludovic Genest (born 18 September 1987) is a French former professional footballer who played as a striker.

Career
Born in Thiers, Genest previously played for Auxerre, Bastia, Laval and Istres. He scored his first Ligue 1 goal in a Bastia's 2–1 defeat at Lille on 15 December 2013. He signed an 18-month contract with US Créteil-Lusitanos in January 2014, and went on to play 38 league games for the club.

On 10 June 2015, it was announced that Genest had signed a two-year deal with Clermont Foot.

Genest decided to retire at the end of the 2018–19 season.

References

External links
 

1987 births
Living people
People from Thiers
Sportspeople from Puy-de-Dôme
Association football forwards
French footballers
AJ Auxerre players
SC Bastia players
Stade Lavallois players
FC Istres players
US Créteil-Lusitanos players
Clermont Foot players
Ligue 1 players
Ligue 2 players
Footballers from Auvergne-Rhône-Alpes